Ventec Life Systems is an American medical device company based in Bothell, Washington.

History
Ventec Life Systems was founded in Bothell, Washington, a suburb of Seattle, by Doug DeVries. According to the New York Times, Ventec is known for its VOCSN model, which received approval from the Food and Drug Administration in 2017. The VOCSN is the size of a large toaster oven, and combines a number of functions that had previously been performed by several machines to pump air into the lungs, suction out secretions, and produce oxygen when a central oxygen line is not available. It is used in critical-care hospital units and in home care. Jim Alwan is the CEO of Ventec and the Chief Strategy Officer of the company is Chris Brooks.

VOCSN
Ventec developed the VOCSN unified respiratory system, which is a portable personal medical device that includes a ventilator, 6 L/min portable oxygen concentrator, cough assist, suction, and nebulization therapies for the patient. The name of the device is an acronym derived from the names of these five functions. It received FDA approval in April 2017, and began to roll out in 2018. The weight of the device is about eighteen pounds. It is designed for use by both children and adults to treat conditions such as muscular degeneration, spinal cord injury, and underdeveloped lungs. As of 2017 it was medically cleared for use in the US and Japan. According to NBC News, its ventilators are transportable and include advanced data monitoring, as well as internal controls to make the most of oxygen consumption. The five-in-one technology compresses 55 pounds of equipment into 18 pounds, and it has a nine-hour battery life.

COVID-19 support
On March 21, 2020, during the COVID-19 pandemic, General Motors announced a partnership with Ventec Life Systems to produce ventilators. The partnership was expected to build 10,000 ventilators per month at GM's facilities in Kokomo, Indiana, using Ventec's VOCSN platform. Ventec is one of twelve worldwide manufacturers of ventilators. However, the partnership between Ventec and GM quickly received a $489 million government contract to deliver 30,000 VOCSN Critical Care Ventilators to the U.S. Department of Health and Human Services. The delivered the first critical care ventilators to medical professionals that month, producing one ventilator every seven minutes in an effort the New Yorker called a "fighter jet in a race with prop planes". The partnership was named one of the 2020 "Top 10 Most Innovative Joint Ventures" by FastCompany.

References

Companies based in Bothell, Washington
Medical technology companies of the United States
Manufacturing companies based in Washington (state)
Mechanical ventilation